San Juan de Cinco Pinos, colloquially known as Cinco Pinos, is a town and a municipality in the north of the Chinandega Department in Nicaragua, situated between San Pedro del Norte and Santo Tomás del Norte.

History

The town was founded in 1879 as a result of the migration of residents from neighboring Honduras. Prior to that time, there was a small village called Villa Salvadorita, 2 km west of the current location of Cinco Pinos. In the early 1950s, with the development of cotton cultivation, the town was renamed to San Juan de Cinco Pinos.

The festivities of the patron saint of Cinco Pinos is held in honor of San Caralampio. The event takes place every year from February 9 to 11, with the traditional Toro Huaco dance and chichero music.

Geography 

The population of San Juan de Cinco Pinos is mainly rural. Only 21% lives in the town of Cinco Pinos and the rest are scattered around the 14 comarcas of the municipality.

El Carrizal
El Cerro 
El Espino 
El Jícaro 
El Pavón
El Zacatón
La Honda
La Montaña
Las Lajitas
Las Pozas 
Los Araditos 
Santa Fe
Villa Camilo 
Villa Francia

References

Municipalities of the Chinandega Department